The 1980 Jacksonville State Gamecocks football team represented Jacksonville State University as a member of the Gulf South Conference (GSC) during the 1980 NCAA Division II football season. Led by fourth-year head coach Jim Fuller, the Gamecocks compiled an overall record of 8–3 with a mark of 6–1 in conference play, and finished second in the GSC. In the playoffs, Jacksonville State were defeated by Cal Poly in the first round.

Schedule

References

Jacksonville State
Jacksonville State Gamecocks football seasons
Jacksonville State Gamecocks football